Warrant is an American glam metal band from Hollywood, California. The group was formed in summer 1984 by lead vocalist Adam Shore and drummer Max Asher (real name Max Mazursky). Also in the original line-up included were lead guitarist Josh Lewis, rhythm guitarist Erik Turner, and bassist Chris Vincent. Vincent was replaced after only three months by Jerry Dixon. 

Shore and Asher left in September 1986, with Turner bringing in Jani Lane and Steven Sweet from the group Plain Jane as their replacements. The following March, Joey Allen replaced Lewis. 

Warrant released its debut album Dirty Rotten Filthy Stinking Rich in 1989, which was followed by Cherry Pie the following year and Dog Eat Dog in 1992. Lane briefly left Warrant in March 1993 to start a solo career, but within 18 months had returned to the band.

Prior to Lane's return, Allen also left in May 1994, followed by Sweet the following month; later in the year, they were replaced by Kingdom Come's Rick Steier and James Kottak, respectively. Kottak only remained for two years, with Bobby Borg taking his place after the release and touring of Ultraphobic. Borg left in 1997 and was replaced on tour by Vik Foxx and later Danny Wagner, the latter of whom had previously played keyboards for the group. Steier and Wagner both subsequently left the band in early 2000. Replacing Steier with Billy Morris and Wagner with Mike Fasano, Warrant released Under the Influence, an album of cover versions, in 2001. On April 2, 2003, Fasano was fired from the band by Lane, with Kevin Phares of the vocalist's solo band taking his place.

Lane left Warrant for a second time in January 2004 to focus on his solo career, with the group announcing the return of Allen, Fasano and the addition of new frontman Jaime St. James the following month. By March, Fasano had been replaced by the returning Sweet, marking a reunion of the band's classic lineup with the exception of Lane. Born Again, the first Warrant album without Lane, was released in 2006. In early 2008, Lane returned to front Warrant for a third time. The reunion lasted less than a year, however, as Lane left for a final time in September and was replaced by former Lynch Mob frontman Robert Mason. Lane later died on August 11, 2011 of acute alcohol poisoning.

Members

Current

Former

Touring

Timeline

Lineups

References

External links
Warrant official website

Warrant